Rohan Anthony Marley (born 19 May 1972) is a Jamaican entrepreneur and former college football player. He is the son of reggae artist Bob Marley and father of model Selah Marley and football player Nico Marley. He was born to 16 year old Janet Hunt during his father's marriage to singer Rita Marley and went to live with her on and off from the age of four until moving to live with Marley's mother after his father died of cancer in Miami in 1981.

Education
Marley graduated from Miami Palmetto Senior High School in 1991. He then attended the University of Miami School of Business at the University of Miami in Coral Gables, Florida, where he played linebacker for the University of Miami football team. In 1993, he led the Hurricanes' defense with 95 tackles.

Marley later played professional football in the Canadian Football League with the Ottawa Rough Riders.

Career
In 2009, he co-founded Marley Coffee, an organic coffee plantation and sustainable farming business in Jamaica's Blue Mountains, although the majority of coffee sourced through Marley Coffee is from Ethiopia. The business is run on a 52-acre estate in Portland Parish. In 2011, Marley Coffee went public under the name Jammin Java (OTC:JAMN).

In January 2011, Marley advertised a new 'House of Marley' range of eco-friendly headphones at the Consumer Electronics Show in Las Vegas, Nevada. The range has since expanded and now produces Headphones and Speakers as well as turntables.

Marley also helps run his family's charitable organization, 1Love, as well as the Tuff Gong Clothing Company.

He made an appearance in the documentary film Motherland.

Personal life
On 18 March 1993, while a sophomore in college, Marley married his girlfriend Geraldine Khawly. They had a daughter, Eden (b. 1994), and a son, Nico (b. 1995), a linebacker who played at Tulane and was signed by the Washington Redskins in 2017.

Marley met musician Lauryn Hill in 1996 and they had five children: Zion David (b. 1997), model Selah Louise (b. 1998), Joshua Omaru (b. 2001), John Nesta (b. 2003), and Sara (b. 2008). Marley and Hill lived apart for most of their relationship, which ended in 2009. Marley took temporary custody of their five children while Hill served a three-month prison sentence for tax evasion in 2013. Hill sometimes referred to Marley as her husband, but they never married.

In 2003, Rolling Stone suggested that Marley had never divorced Khawly. However, in 2011, Marley produced a Haitian divorce decree which demonstrated that he had divorced Khawly in 1996.

Marley was briefly engaged to Isabeli Fontana, but the engagement ended in early 2013.

On March 23, 2019, Marley married Brazilian model Barbara Fialho in Montes Claros, Brazil. They have a daughter reportedly born in August 2019, announced in a post from Fialho's Instagram account, titled "Maria".

References

External links
 Online home to the Marley Family
 Rohan Marley at BobMarley.com
 Marley Coffee
 1Love
 Rohan Marley Divorce Document

1972 births
Living people
American football linebackers
Canadian football linebackers
Jamaican businesspeople
Jamaican people of English descent
Jamaican players of American football
Jamaican Rastafarians
R
Miami Hurricanes football players
Ottawa Rough Riders players
Sportspeople from Kingston, Jamaica
University of Miami Business School alumni